The 2020 CONCACAF Nations League Final was a soccer match that determined the winners of the final tournament of the 2019–20 CONCACAF Nations League. It was the inaugural final of the CONCACAF Nations League, an international soccer competition involving the men's national teams of the member associations of CONCACAF. The match was originally scheduled to be held on June 7, 2020, at AT&T Stadium in Arlington, United States. On April 3, 2020, the final tournament was postponed due to the COVID-19 pandemic. On July 27, 2020, CONCACAF announced that the Nations League Finals would be held in March 2021, though on September 22, 2020, CONCACAF announced that the tournament was again rescheduled until June 2021.

The United States won the final 3–2 after extra time to become the first champions of the CONCACAF Nations League.

Venue
The final was played at Empower Field at Mile High, an American football venue in Denver, Colorado. The venue seats 76,125 spectators, and is primarily used by the Denver Broncos of the National Football League, but had hosted the Colorado Rapids of Major League Soccer in the past. Empower Field at Mile High had hosted two matches of the Gold Cup group stage in 2013, 2015, and 2019. CONCACAF announced its selection of Empower Field at Mile High as the venue for the CONCACAF Nations League Finals on April 15, 2021.

Route to the final

Note: In all results below, the score of the finalist is given first (H: home; A: away).

Broadcasting

The Nations League Final was broadcast in the United States on the CBS Sports Network and Paramount+ in English and Univision in Spanish. The Univision broadcast drew a 0.8 Nielsen rating, peaking at approximately 1.96 million viewers and tying a Celebrity Family Feud broadcast for the most-watched primetime broadcast of the day. The match was broadcast in Mexico by Televisa and in Canada by OneSoccer.

Match

Details

Statistics

Notes

References

External links

Final
June 2021 sports events in the United States
Association football events postponed due to the COVID-19 pandemic
Nations League
United States men's national soccer team matches
Mexico national football team matches
2021 in American soccer
2020–21 in Mexican football
Mexico–United States soccer rivalry